Ephemerella invaria, the sulphur dun, is a species of spiny crawler mayfly in the family Ephemerellidae. It is found in southeastern and northern Canada and the eastern United States.

References

Mayflies
Articles created by Qbugbot
Insects described in 1853